Dzmitry Kalachow (born 16 June 1978) is a retired Belarusian professional footballer.

He is the older brother of the Belarusian international Timofei Kalachev.

Honours
Dnepr-Transmash Mogilev
Belarusian Premier League champion: 1998

Dinamo Minsk
Belarusian Premier League champion: 2004

Dinamo Brest
Belarusian Cup winner: 2006–07

External links

1978 births
Living people
Belarusian footballers
FC RUOR Minsk players
FC Dnepr Mogilev players
FC Dinamo Minsk players
FC Shakhtyor Soligorsk players
FC Dynamo Brest players
FC Darida Minsk Raion players
FC Belshina Bobruisk players
FC Slutsk players
FC Gorki players
Association football midfielders